Načić is a Serbian surname. The surname has been recorded in Paraćin (slava of Mitrovdan), Prizren, Šabac, and Zaječar (from where Taško Načić's family hails).

It may refer to:

 Jelisaveta Načić (1878–1955), Serbian architect
 Taško Načić (1934-1993), Serbian actor

References

Serbian surnames